Rebecca Stead (born January 16, 1968) is an American writer of fiction for children and teens. She won the American Newbery Medal in 2010, the oldest award in children's literature, for her second novel When You Reach Me.

She won the Guardian Prize in 2013 recognizing Liar & Spy as the year's best British children's book by a writer who has not previously won it.

Life
Born and raised in New York City, Stead enjoyed her elementary school years and fondly remembers reading books in a windowsill or under a table.

She attended Vassar College and received her bachelors degree in 1989.

Rebecca Stead is married to attorney Sean O'Brien and has two sons. She and her family live on the Upper West Side of Manhattan.

Career
Rebecca Stead enjoyed writing as a child but later felt that it was "impractical" and became a lawyer instead. After years as a public defender she returned to writing after the birth of her two children. She credits her son with inspiring her to write a children's novel, but not in the way one would expect. For years she had collected story ideas and short stories on a laptop, which the child one day pushed off a table, destroying what she considered her serious writing. As a way to lighten her mood she began again with something light-hearted —her debut novel First Light, which was published in 2007 by Wendy Lamb Books, an imprint of Random House.

When You Reach Me takes place in New York City during 1978–1988. The story follows Miranda, a sixth grader, as she recalls the events of the past few months, laying out clues and puzzles as she asks an unseen listener to figure it out. The setting is a tiny slice of Manhattan, filled with abundant details and vivid characters. It has been described as suspense with a bit of the supernatural. Miranda is a great fan of Madeleine L'Engle's classic, A Wrinkle in Time, and references to that book help add to the mystery of the novel. Three plot lines run through this novel, seemingly unrelated as the tale begins: Miranda's mother prepares to be a guest on The $20,000 Pyramid; Miranda's lifelong friend Sal will no longer speak to her; and "the laughing man", a very strange homeless man catches Miranda's attention in a strange way.

Critical response
In review of When You Reach Me, Publishers Weekly applauds Stead's ability to "make every detail count" as she creates a plausible conclusion with these divergent and improbable plot lines. A New York Times book review called it a "taut novel, every word, every sentence, has meaning and substance."

Stead was awarded the 2010 Newbery Medal by the Association for Library Service to Children for her second book, When You Reach Me. The judges agreed strongly with The New York Times reviewer. According to the chair, "Every scene, every nuance, every word is vital both to character development and the progression of the mystery that really is going to engage readers and satisfy them."

In 2012, When You Reach Me was ranked number 11 among all-time best children's novels in a survey published by School Library Journal, a monthly with primarily U.S. audience. It was the only 21st-century work among the top 20. 

Stead won the 2013 Guardian Children's Fiction Prize for Liar & Spy, which was published in the UK by Andersen Press. Stead became the first winning writer from the U.S.
– or from anywhere outside the British Commonwealth. Prior to 2012, eligibility had been extended to all books published or co-published in the U.K. (by writers who have not yet won the award).

Goodbye Stranger was published by Wendy Lamb in August 2015. In a starred review (its third for Stead's novels), Kirkus Reviews observed that "the protagonists try on their new and changing lives with a mixture of caution and recklessness. Stead adroitly conveys the way things get complicated so quickly and so completely for even fairly ordinary children at the edge of growing up ... She captures the stomach-churning moments of a misstep or an unplanned betrayal and reworks these events with grace, humor, and polish into possibilities for kindness and redemption."

Works
 First Light (Random House Children's Books: Wendy Lamb Books, 2007)
 When You Reach Me (Wendy Lamb, 2009)
 Liar & Spy (Wendy Lamb, 2012)
 Goodbye Stranger (Wendy Lamb, 2015) 
 The List of Things That Will Not Change (Wendy Lamb, 2020)

Adaptations
 When You Cant Reach Me: Listening Library (2009) 4 CDs, ISBN

References

External links
 
 
 First Light Book (official)
 
 

1968 births
Living people
American writers of young adult literature
American children's writers
American science fiction writers
American women novelists
Guardian Children's Fiction Prize winners
Newbery Medal winners
People from the Upper West Side
21st-century American novelists
21st-century American women writers
Writers from Manhattan
Vassar College alumni
American women children's writers
Women science fiction and fantasy writers
Women writers of young adult literature
Novelists from New York (state)